The Tower, Meridian Quay is a residential tower in Swansea, Wales, United Kingdom. It is the tallest building in Wales. Standing at 107 m (351 ft), Meridian Quay is the only skyscraper in Wales (buildings over 100 m tall) and one of several high-rises in Swansea. It is the 106th tallest building in the United Kingdom in joint place with the Shell Centre in the London Borough of Lambeth.

The tower has 29 storeys, double the number of the previous tallest building in Swansea, the BT Tower. Most of the tower houses residential apartments.  The ground floor has a concierge desk which is staffed 24 hours a day, whilst the top three floors form the Grape and Olive restaurant run by the Brains Brewery  This was opened following the unsuccessful 290 cover Penthouse restaurant. Press reports stated that the penthouse apartment on the 26th floor was sold for £1 million.
On 26 January 2008, one of the construction workers died after falling three storeys from the tower. The construction company, Carillion, chose not to release his name. The tower "topped-out" to its full height on 12 September 2008.

Gallery

References

External links

BBC News Article
Skyscrapernews website page on Meridian Quay
Swansea Council planning approval for Meridian Quay
Fatal accident at the tower

Buildings and structures in Swansea
Swansea Bay
Residential skyscrapers in Wales
Residential buildings completed in 2008
Landmarks in Swansea